The 44th Japan National University Rugby Championship (2007/2008). Eventually won by Waseda beating Keio 26–6.

Qualifying Teams
Kanto League A (Taiko)
 Waseda, Meiji University, Keio University, Teikyo University, University of Tsukuba

Kanto League B
 Tokai University, Takushoku University, Hosei University, Daito University, Chuo University

Kansai League
 Doshisha University, Kyoto Sangyo University, Osaka University of Health and Sport Sciences, Ritsumeikan, Kwansei Gakuin

Kyushu League
 Fukuoka

Knockout stage

Final

Universities Competing
 Waseda
 Meiji University
 Keio University
 Teikyo University
 University of Tsukuba
 Tokai University
 Takushoku University
 Hosei University
 Daito University
 Chuo University
 Doshisha University
 Kyoto Sangyo University
 Osaka University of Health and Sport Sciences
 Ritsumeikan
 Kwansei Gakuin
 Fukuoka

External links
 The 44th Japan University Rugby Championship - JRFU Official Page (Japanese)
 The 44th Japan University Rugby Championship Final - JRFU Official Page (Japanese)
 Rugby union in Japan

All-Japan University Rugby Championship
Univ